Tom Brown's School Days is a 1940 coming-of-age drama film about a teenage boy's experiences at Rugby School, Warwickshire in the early 19th century under the reforming headmastership of Thomas Arnold. It stars Sir Cedric Hardwicke, Freddie Bartholomew and Jimmy Lydon in the title role. The film was based on the 1857 novel, Tom Brown's School Days by Thomas Hughes.

In this version emphasis is placed on the development of Headmaster Thomas Arnold and his reformist ideas concerning the English public school. It was well received by critics, with Variety praising it in a December 31, 1939, review as "sympathetically and skilfully made, with many touching moments and an excellent cast". Hardwicke's performance as Arnold was called "one of the best he has ever given on the screen," as the veteran actor convincingly tempered the headmaster's strict demeanour with "the underlying sympathy, tolerance, quiet humour and steadfast courage" for which Arnold was acclaimed. Jimmy Lydon as the title character was called "believable and moving in the early portions, but too young for the final moments".

The core of the plot focuses on bullying from the older boys (and Flashman in particular),with only Tom being willing to stand up to them.Honour and loyalty between schoolfriends is critical. Tom faces expulsion, not for his theft of a cart but for lying. When he eventually confesses he is spared expulsion and Dr Arnold gives him "12 of the best" with a smile.

The June 27, 1940 debut of the film version at New York City's Radio City Music Hall was chronicled in a photo spread by The New York Times, "showing some of the pastimes, curricular and otherwise", as the fight scene between Tom Brown and Flashman was captioned.

Cast
Cedric Hardwicke as Dr. Thomas Arnold 
Freddie Bartholomew as Ned East
Jimmy Lydon as Tom Brown
Josephine Hutchinson as Mrs. Mary Arnold
Billy Halop as Flashman
Polly Moran as Sally Harowell
Hughie Green as Walker 
Ian Fulton as Brooke
Ernest Cossart as Squire Brown
Alec Craig as Old Thomas
Gale Storm as Effie
Lionel Belmore as Tavern Keeper (uncredited) 
Barlowe Borland as Grimsby (uncredited)

Reception
The film recorded a loss of $110,000.

The entertainment journal Variety praised the adaptation, saying, "It probably results in a better picture, since Cedric Hardwicke, who plays the wise and kindly teacher, is much better qualified to carry a story than is any Hollywood prodigy. Hardwicke’s performance is one of the best he has ever given on the screen".

DVD version
The 1940 film version was released on DVD in 2004.

References

External links
 
 
 
 

1940 films
American black-and-white films
American coming-of-age drama films
Films based on Tom Brown's Schooldays
Films directed by Robert Stevenson
1940s coming-of-age drama films
RKO Pictures films
1940s American films